Fårikål is a traditional Norwegian dish, and the country's national dish. It consists of pieces of mutton with bone, cabbage, whole black pepper and occasionally a little wheat flour, cooked for several hours in a casserole, traditionally served with potatoes boiled in their skins. The dish is typically prepared in early autumn.

Fårikål Feast Day is celebrated on the last Thursday in September each year.

Name
Fårikål is a compound word literally meaning "mutton in cabbage". The name was amended from Danish "gaas i hvidkaal" (goose in white cabbage).

In popular culture
On September 29, 2012, Guinness World Records approved the World Record of making the largest portion of fårikål ever. The result was 594.2 kg fårikål, prepared to be finished at the same time, consisting of 60% lamb and 40% cabbage. The event happened in Spikersuppa, Oslo, Norway, and there were 10,000 guests present.

In the 1970s, fårikål was elected national dish of Norway by the popular radio programme Nitimen. In 2014, after the controversial decision by the food and agriculture minister Sylvi Listhaug to hold a new competition, it was reconfirmed as the national dish.

See also

 List of lamb dishes
 List of stews

References

External links
 Video of the preparation of fårikål, in English

Norwegian stews
Lamb dishes
National dishes
Cabbage soups
Stock (food)